The Wooden Church was a church in Bocșa, Sălaj, Romania, built in 1750 and demolished in 1937.

References

Bibliography 
 Leontin Ghergariu, „Biserici de lemn din Sălaj”. manuscris în Arhivele Naționale din Zalău, colecția personală Leontin Ghergariu.

Churches completed in 1750
Buildings and structures demolished in 1937
Greek-Catholic churches in Romania
Wooden churches in Sălaj County